is a railway station in the city of Toyokawa, Aichi Prefecture, Japan, operated by Central Japan Railway Company (JR Tōkai).

Lines
Ushikubo Station is served by the Iida Line, and is located 6.6 kilometers from the southern terminus of the line at Toyohashi Station.

Station layout
The station has two opposed side platforms connected by a footbridge. The station building has automated ticket machines, TOICA automated turnstiles and has a Customer support service.

Platforms

Adjacent stations

|-
!colspan=5|Central Japan Railway Company

Station history
On August 1, 1943, the Toyokawa Railway was nationalized along with some other local lines to form the Japanese Government Railways (JGR) Iida Line. Due to the expansion of traffic at the nearby Toyokawa Naval Arsenal, the station buildingw was also rebuilt in 1943; this building survived the Toyokawa Air Raid and is still used as the station building to date. Scheduled freight operations were discontinued in 1971. Along with its division and privatization of JNR on April 1, 1987, the station came under the control and operation of the Central Japan Railway Company (JR Tōkai).

Station numbering was introduced to the Iida Line in March 2018; Ushikubo Station was assigned station number CE04.

Passenger statistics
In fiscal 2017, the station was used by an average of 877 passengers daily.

Surrounding area
site of Ushikubo Castle
 Ushikubo Elementary School

See also
 List of Railway Stations in Japan

References

External links

Railway stations in Japan opened in 1897
Railway stations in Aichi Prefecture
Iida Line
Stations of Central Japan Railway Company
Toyokawa, Aichi